The Egypt men's national under-23 volleyball team, represents Egypt in international volleyball competitions and friendly matches.

Results
 Champions   Runners up   Third place   Fourth place

Green border color indicates tournament was held on home soil.

FIVB U23 World Championship

Men's U23 African Volleyball Championship

Team

Current squad
The following is the Egyptian roster in the 2017 FIVB Men's U23 World Championship.

Head coach: Marcos Pinheiro Miranda

References

External links
www.fevb.org 

Volleyball
National men's under-23 volleyball teams
Volleyball in Egypt
Men's sport in Egypt